Bulgaria has participated in the Eurovision Song Contest 14 times since making its debut at the 2005 contest in Kyiv. The country's best result is a second-place finish for Kristian Kostov and the song "Beautiful Mess" at the  contest also in Kyiv.

History

1993–2003
Bulgaria had previously planned to debut at the Eurovision Song Contest in 1993, 1996 and 2003; the latter year the broadcaster was unable to take part after the European Broadcasting Union (EBU) decided that too many countries would be relegated from participation in 2003 if the country took part.

2005–2010
Bulgaria ultimately debuted at the Eurovision Song Contest in 2005, represented by the jazz-inspired band Kaffe with their song "Lorraine". Receiving only 49 points, they placed 19th in the semi-final and failed to qualify to the final. They were succeeded by Mariana Popova with "Let Me Cry", however she also failed to qualify for the final, coming 17th with 36 points in the semi-final.

Bulgaria's first qualification for the final came in 2007 when Elitsa Todorova and Stoyan Yankoulov performed the song "Water". This was the first Bulgarian-language song to compete in the contest, placing 6th in the semi-final with 146 points. Todorova and Yankulov repeated their song in the final and received 157 points, placing 5th in a field of 24.

In previous years, if a country placed in the top 10 countries in the final they automatically qualified to the final of the next contest. Had this rule remained for the 2008 contest, Bulgaria would have directly qualified for the final. However, a change in rules due to the large intake of countries participating in the contest meant that only five countries, the host country and the "Big Four" countries, would automatically qualify to the final. As such, Bulgaria was obliged to compete in one of the two semi-finals of the 2008 contest.

At the 2008 contest, Bulgaria were represented by Deep Zone and Balthazar with the song "DJ, Take Me Away". They, however, could not repeat Todorova and Yankulov's result and received only 56 points, placing 11th of 19 competing in the second semi-final, thereby failing to qualify Bulgaria for the final.

Bulgaria competed in the 2009 contest in Russia, with a two-phase national selection process beginning in October 2008. The winner was Krassimir Avramov with his song "Illusion". It failed to qualify for the final, coming 16th out of 18 participants in the first semi-final.

In October 2009, BNT announced that Miroslav Kostadinov would represent Bulgaria at the 2010 contest in Oslo, Norway, with the song "". It was the first song since 2007 to be sung in Bulgarian. However, for the third consecutive year, Bulgaria's entry failed to qualify for the final, coming 15th out of 17 participants in the second semi-final.

2011–2018
In 2011, Bulgaria was represented by Poli Genova, and the country's entry was sung in Bulgarian for the second consecutive year. Her song was called "", and missed out on a place for the final after coming 12th in the Semi-final 2, making 2011 the fourth year in a row that Bulgaria didn't reach the final. In that year she competed with 18 more singers in the final of "EuroBGvision" (where by means of SMS voting the TV audience selects who will represent Bulgaria in the Eurovision Song Contest). This was her fourth time in which she took part in the "EuroBGvision" and her first win.

Sofi Marinova represented Bulgaria in the 2012 contest in Baku with "Love Unlimited". Her song was mainly in Bulgarian, but it also contains the phrase "I love you" in 12 other languages, including Turkish, Greek, Spanish, French, and Serbian. Bulgaria's entry tied with Norway for 10th place in its sem-ifinal; however, the tie broke in favor of Norway because it received points from more countries, making 2012 the fifth year in a row that Bulgaria didn't qualify.

In 2013, Elitsa Todorova and Stoyan Yankoulov were chosen through an internal selection to represent Bulgaria for a second time. Their song "" placed sixth in the second semi-final's televoting results, but 17th place (last) in the jury's results. The duo placed twelfth, with 45 points, thereby failing to qualify Bulgaria for the final for the sixth consecutive year. The nation subsequently announced on 22 November 2013, 
that they would not be participating in the 2014 contest due to financial problems.

On 15 September 2014, it was announced that Bulgaria had submitted a preliminary application to compete in the 2015 contest, but the following month, it was announced that they would not be returning to the contest. On 31 October 2014, it was announced that Bulgaria's participation was still undecided due to the political situation of the country. The EBU granted an extension and awaited a final decision. On 18 December 2014, BNT confirmed via their official Eurovision Twitter account that they would not take part in the 2015 contest.

On 15 September 2015, it was announced that BNT sent a preliminary application in order to compete in the 2016 contest, and the effective participation was further confirmed on 26 November 2015. Poli Genova was selected to represent Bulgaria for the second time, having previously done so in 2011. With "If Love Was a Crime", Poli performed twelfth at the second semi-final on 12 May 2016, and qualified for the final by finishing in 5th place with 220 points. In the final on 14 May 2016, she performed eighth and placed 4th with 307 points.
 
In 2017, Kristian Kostov represented Bulgaria with "Beautiful Mess", being the first singer at Eurovision to have been born in the 2000s decade. He placed 1st in the second semi-final, with 403 points, the best score ever in any semi-final, qualifying Bulgaria to the finals for the third time. Kristian Kostov ended up getting the best result for Bulgaria to date, finishing in 2nd place with 615 points.

In 2018, BNT selected Equinox with "Bones". The group performed tenth in the first semi-final and qualified for the final, placing 7th with 177 points. Bulgaria reached the final for the fourth time, finishing 14th with 166 points.

2019–2022

The country internally selected Victoria as its representative with "Tears Getting Sober". Her entry for 2021, "Growing Up Is Getting Old", was internally chosen from a selection of songs from her EP A Little Dramatic, with input from the public and various focus groups. Victoria performed thirteenth at the second semi-final and qualified for the final, placing third with 250 points, thereby achieving Bulgaria's fifth final appearance. She then went on to finish 11th with 170 points.  

In , BNT selected Intelligent Music Project with "Intention". The group failed to qualify for the final, finishing 16th in the first semi-final with 29 points. BNT later confirmed its absence from the  contest, citing financial constraints.

Participation overview

Awards

Marcel Bezençon Awards

Related involvement

Heads of delegation
The public broadcaster of each participating country in the Eurovision Song Contest assigns a head of delegation as the EBU's contact person and the leader of their delegation at the event. The delegation, whose size can greatly vary, includes a head of press, the contestants, songwriters, composers and backing vocalists, among others.

Commentators and spokespersons

Gallery

See also
Bulgaria in the Eurovision Young Dancers – A competition organised by the EBU for younger dancers aged between 16 and 21.
Bulgaria in the Eurovision Young Musicians – A competition organised by the EBU for musicians aged 18 years and younger.
Bulgaria in the Junior Eurovision Song Contest – Junior version of the Eurovision Song Contest.
Bulgaria in the Turkvision Song Contest – A contest for countries and regions which are of Turkic-speaking or Turkic ethnicity.

Notes and references

Notes

References

Bibliography 
 

 
Countries in the Eurovision Song Contest